The International Landworkers' Federation (ILF) was a global union federation bringing together trade unions representing agricultural and forestry workers.

History
The federation was established in 1920 at a conference in Amsterdam, and set up its headquarters in Utrecht.  In 1924, it relocated to Berlin, but returned to Utrecht in 1933.  By 1925, it had 15 affiliates, with a total of 377,800 members, and by 1954 this had grown to more than 1,000,000 members, principally in Europe.

In 1960, the federation merged with the Plantation Workers International Federation, which mostly represented workers on plantations in poorer countries, forming the International Federation of Plantation and Agricultural Workers.

Affiliates
In 1954, the following unions were affiliated to the federation:

Leadership

General Secretaries
1920: Piet Hiemstra
1924: Georg Schmidt
1933: Piet Hiemstra
1938: Oscar Lewinsen
1942: Walter Kwasnik
1950: Adri de Ruijter

Presidents
1920: Walter Smith
1924: Joseph Forbes Duncan
1950: Edwin Gooch

References

Trade unions established in 1920
Trade unions disestablished in 1958
Global union federations
Agriculture and forestry trade unions